The Queiles is an tributary of the Ebro.  Its arises in Vozmediano (Soria). It flows through Tarazona and empties into the Ebro near Tudela, Navarre.

See also 
 List of rivers of Spain

Rivers of Spain
Rivers of Castile and León
Rivers of Navarre
Rivers of Aragon